Mahesh Trivedi is an Indian politician and former Minister of State for Stamp, Duty Tax and Entertainment Tax in the Government of Uttar Pradesh. Currently he represents Kidwai Nagar constituency of Kanpur Nagar district in Uttar Pradesh Legislative Assembly. Formerly he represents Rajpur and Derapur constituency of Kanpur Dehat district respectively from Independent and Bahujan Samaj Party. In 2012 elections, he unsuccessfully contested from Bhognipur constituency of Kanpur Dehat district.

References
Mahesh Trivedi - Official Website

External links
Profile on National Election Watch

Bharatiya Janata Party politicians from Uttar Pradesh
People from Kanpur Nagar district
1967 births
Living people
Uttar Pradesh MLAs 2017–2022
Uttar Pradesh MLAs 2002–2007
Uttar Pradesh MLAs 2007–2012
Uttar Pradesh MLAs 2022–2027